The enzyme 3-hydroxyisobutyryl-CoA hydrolase (EC 3.1.2.4) catalyzes the reaction

3-hydroxy-2-methylpropanoyl-CoA + H2O  CoA + 3-hydroxy-2-methylpropanoate

This enzyme belongs to the family of hydrolases, specifically those acting on thioester bonds.  The systematic name is 3-hydroxy-2-methylpropanoyl-CoA hydrolase. Other names in common use include 3-hydroxy-isobutyryl CoA hydrolase, and HIB CoA deacylase.  This enzyme participates in 3 metabolic pathways: valine, leucine and isoleucine degradation, β-alanine metabolism, and propanoate metabolism. 3-hydroxyisobutyryl-CoA hydrolase is encoded by HIBCH gene.

References 

 

EC 3.1.2
Enzymes of unknown structure